Sitaron Se Aagey is a 1958 Hindi Black-and-white family film written and directed by Satyen Bose. The film starred Ashok Kumar and Vyjayanthimala, with Johnny Walker, Rajasulochana, Shammi, Jagdish Sethi, Manmohan Krishna and Leela Mishra in supporting roles. The film was produced by V. L. Narasu. The film's score was composed by S. D. Burman with lyrics provided by Majrooh Sultanpuri. Editing was done by Bimal Roy and it was filmed by K. H. Kapadia.

Cast
 Ashok Kumar as Rajesh 
 Vyjayanthimala as Kanta 
 Johnny Walker as Lattu
 Rajasulochana as Rajni
 Shammi as Lattu's Girlfriend
 Leela Mishra as Kanta's Aunty
 Jagdish Sethi as Shyamlal
 Manmohan Krishna as Shambhulal
 Iftekhar as Mohan

Soundtrack
The film's soundtrack was composed by S. D. Burman with the lyrics penned by Majrooh Sultanpuri. The album had singer Geeta Dutt singing a Spanish song, where she lent her voice for actress Vyjayanthimala.

In 1958, the song "Zara Ruk Ja Pyare" was listed at number 11 on the Binaca Geetmala annual top songs.

References

External links
 
Sitaron Se Aagey profile at Upperstall.com

1958 films
1950s Hindi-language films
Indian musical films
Films scored by S. D. Burman
1958 musical films